Comicus is a genus of southern African Orthopteran insects of the family Schizodactylidae, erected by Brunner von Wattenwyl in 1888.

Species
The Orthoptera Species File lists:
 Comicus arenarius Ramme, 1931
 Comicus cabonegrus Irish, 1986
 Comicus calaharicus Irish, 1986
 Comicus calcaris Irish, 1986
 Comicus campestris Irish, 1986
 Comicus capensis Brunner von Wattenwyl, 1888 - type species
 Comicus carnalli Irish, 1995
 Comicus cavillorus Irish, 1986
 Comicus myburghi Gorochov, 2021
 Comicus namibicus Gorochov, 2021
 Comicus orangensis Gorochov, 2021

References

External links
 

Orthoptera of Africa
Ensifera genera